Carolyn G. Begley, OD, MS, FAAO  is Emerita Professor of optometry at Indiana University.   She holds an M.S.(1979) and O.D. (1983) from Indiana University. She has been the recipient of several awards,  such as the Garland M. Clay Award from the American Academy of Optometry for her most cited paper, “Characteristics of corneal staining in hydrogel contact lens wearers”  and the Max Schapero Memorial Lecture Award, also from the AAO.    She is a Fellow of the AAO.  As an NIH-funded researcher, she participated in a Congressional briefing on dry eye syndrome therapies. According to the Web of Science, she has published over 80 articles in peer-reviewed medical journals that, had been cited more than 1100 times, giving her an h-index of 19.

References

External links
PubMed search for Carolyn G. Begley

Living people
American optometrists
Year of birth missing (living people)

Indiana University faculty
Women medical researchers
Indiana University alumni
American medical academics